Sher 25 is a blue supergiant star  in the constellation Carina, located approximately 25,000 light years from the Sun in the H II region NGC 3603 of the Milky Way. It is a spectral type B1Iab star with an apparent magnitude of 12.2.  Its initial main sequence mass is calculated at 60 times the mass of the Sun, but a star of this type will have already lost a substantial fraction of that mass.  It is unclear whether Sher 25 has been through a red supergiant phase or has just evolved from the main sequence, so the current mass is very uncertain.

The name derives from the original cataloguing of stars in NGC 3603 by David Sher.  This catalogue entry is more fully referred to as NGC 3603 Sher 25 to distinguish it from stars potentially numbered 25 by Sher in other clusters (eg. NGC 3766).  The same star was numbered 13 by Melnick, Tapia, and Terlevich (MTT 13) and 5 in a Hubble Space Telescope survey by Moffat, Drissen, and Shara (NGC 3603 MDS 5).

It is speculated that Sher 25 is near the point of exploding as a supernova, as it has recently thrown off matter in a pattern similar to that of supernova 1987A in the Large Magellanic Cloud, with a circumstellar ring and bipolar outflow filaments.

Regular variations in the doppler shift of the star's spectral lines with a period of a few days may be due to orbital motion about a companion star, or to pulsations of the star's surface.

References

External links

NGC 3603
Carina (constellation)
B-type supergiants
Luminous blue variables